Ulvøya may refer to several islands in Norway:

Ulvøya (Hadsel), an island in Hadsel municipality, Nordland county
Ulvøya (Hitra), an island in Hitra municipality, Trøndelag county
Ulvøya (Karmøy), an island in Karmøy municipality, Rogaland county
Ulvøya (Lurøy), an island in Lurøy municipality, Nordland county
Ulvøya (Oslo), an island in Oslo municipality, Oslo county